NASCAR Racing 2002 Season is the successor to NASCAR Racing 4, released in 2002.

Reception

The game received "generally favorable reviews", just one point shy of "universal acclaim", according to the review aggregation website Metacritic.

According to Edge, the game sold at least 100,000 copies in the United States, but was beaten by NASCAR Racing 4s 260,000 sales in the region. Total US sales of NASCAR Racing computer games released in the 2000s reached 900,000 copies by August 2006.

The game won the award for "2002 Best Racing Game" at the 9th Annual PC Gamer Awards. It was placed second for GameSpots February 2002 "Game of the Month" award. The staff called it "one of the best racing experiences in any computer game to date". It was also a runner-up for GameSpots annual "Best Driving Game on PC" award, losing to Rally Trophy.

References

External links
 

2002 video games
MacOS games
NASCAR video games
Papyrus Design Group games
Racing simulators
Racing video games
Sierra Entertainment games
Windows games
Video games developed in the United States
Multiplayer and single-player video games